515 may refer to:

 The year 515.
 The year 515 BC.
 515 (number), the natural number.
 515 Athalia, a carbonaceous Themistian asteroid
 "5:15", a song by The Who.
 "5:15 (Bridgit Mendler song)", a song by American singer, Bridgit Mendler.
 "(515)", a song by American nu metal band Slipknot.
 Area code 515, an area code serving part of the state of Iowa.
 Interstate 515, a spur of Interstate 15 serving the Las Vegas area.
 Fiat 515, a 1930s passenger car